Sergey Vasiliyevich Karasev (Karasyov; born October 26, 1993) is a Russian professional basketball player for Russian team Zenit Saint Petersburg of the VTB United League. He was drafted with the 19th pick in the 2013 NBA draft by the Cleveland Cavaliers.

Professional career

Triumph Lyubertsy (2010–2013)
After playing for the Triumph Lyubertsy Under-23 team in 2009–10, Karasev joined the senior team for the 2010–11 PBL season. Karasev averaged 16.1 points per game during the 2012–13 season of the 2nd-tier European league, the EuroCup. On April 3, 2013, Karasev decided to declare for the NBA draft.

Cleveland Cavaliers (2013–2014)
Karasev was selected with the 19th overall pick by the Cleveland Cavaliers in the 2013 NBA draft. On August 20, 2013, he signed his rookie scale contract with the Cavaliers. During his rookie season, he had multiple assignments with the Canton Charge of the NBA Development League.

Brooklyn Nets (2014–2016)
On July 10, 2014, Karasev was traded to the Brooklyn Nets in a three-team trade involving the Cavaliers and the Boston Celtics. On October 24, 2014, the Nets exercised their third-year team option on Karasev's rookie scale contract, extending the contract through the 2015–16 season. On March 11, 2015, he was ruled out for the rest of the 2014–15 season after being diagnosed with a dislocated patella and a torn MCL of the right knee, along with multiple loose bodies in the knee joint.

On March 26, 2016, Karasev scored a career-high 17 points in a 120–110 win over the Indiana Pacers.

Zenit Saint Petersburg (2016–2019)
On July 1, 2016, Karasev returned to Russia and signed a 2+1 deal with Zenit Saint Petersburg.

BC Khimki (2019–2021)
On July 1, 2019, Karasev signed a two-year contract with Russian club Khimki.

Zenit Saint Petersburg (second stint) (2021–present)
On June 7, 2021, Karasev officially returned to Zenit Saint Petersburg.

Career statistics

NBA

Regular season

|-
| style="text-align:left;"| 
| style="text-align:left;"| Cleveland
| 22 || 1 || 7.1 || .343 || .211 || .900 || .7 || .3 || .1 || .0 || 1.7
|-
| style="text-align:left;"| 
| style="text-align:left;"| Brooklyn
| 33 || 16 || 16.8 || .403 || .296 || .763 || 2.0 || 1.4 || .7 || .0 || 4.6
|-
| style="text-align:left;"| 
| style="text-align:left;"| Brooklyn
| 40 || 5 || 10.0 || .405 || .297 || .929 || 1.5 || .9 || .2 || .1 || 2.4
|-
| style="text-align:center;" colspan="2"| Career
| 95 || 22 || 11.7 || .395 || .282 || .842 || 1.5 || .9 || .3 || .0 || 3.0

Russian national team
Karasev was a regular Russian junior national team representative as he competed at the 2009 FIBA Europe Under-16 Championship, won a silver medal at the 2010 FIBA Europe Under-18 Championship, and a bronze medal at the 2011 FIBA Under-19 World Cup.

Karasev represented the Russian senior national team for the first time at the 2012 Summer Olympics in London.

Personal life
Karasev is the son of former Russian international player and former Zenit Saint Petersburg head coach, Vasily Karasev. He also used to play under his father during his time with Triumph Lyubertsy, as well as for Russia's national team during EuroBasket 2013.

References

External links

 Sergey Karasev at draftexpress.com
 Sergey Karasev at euroleague.net
 Sergey Karasev at fiba.com

1993 births
Living people
2019 FIBA Basketball World Cup players
Basketball players at the 2012 Summer Olympics
Basketball players from Saint Petersburg
BC Zenit Saint Petersburg players
Brooklyn Nets players
Canton Charge players
Cleveland Cavaliers draft picks
Cleveland Cavaliers players
Medalists at the 2012 Summer Olympics
Medalists at the 2013 Summer Universiade
National Basketball Association players from Russia
Olympic basketball players of Russia
Olympic bronze medalists for Russia
Olympic medalists in basketball
Russian expatriate basketball people in the United States
Russian men's basketball players
Shooting guards
Small forwards
Universiade gold medalists for Russia
Universiade medalists in basketball